Hajigabul District is one of the 66 districts of Azerbaijan. It is located in the east of the country and belongs to the Shirvan-Salyan Economic Region. The district borders the districts of Kurdamir, Agsu, Shamakhi, Gobustan, Absheron, Baku, Salyan, Sabirabad and the city of Shirvan. Its capital and largest city is Hajigabul. As of 2020, the district had a population of 76,600.

History 
Hajigabul district located on the Silk Road, was part of the Arab Caliphate, Seljuk, Sacids, Hulakids, Shirvanshahs, Safavids at different times. During the division of the State into the Khanates, the district was included in the Shamakhi khanate. After joining of North Azerbaijan to Tsardom of Russia, it was included in Shamakhi Uyezd of Caspian province which was established in 1830. After the abolition of the Caspian province in 1841, it was included in the Shamakhi governorate. After the devastating earthquake in 1859 in Shamakhi, the capital of the governorate was moved to Baku. In 1860 - 1930, Hajigabul was part of the Shamakhi Uyezd in the Baku province. On August 8, 1930, Uyezd was abolished and as a result of this, the new Garasu was established. Since November 29, 1938, city status has been awarded to Hajigabul.

Divisions 
There are 31 populated areas. One of them is a city, 1 city-like settlement, 4 settlements and 25 villages. There are 15 administrative-territorial units, 5 medical institutions and 55 cultural centres. The Pirsaat River and Prsaat valley is located in this region.

Population 
According to the report of the Statistical Committee of the republic, the number population is 74,7 thousand at the beginning of 2018. 37,4 thousand of them live in urban areas, 37,3 thousand people in rural areas.

Economy 
The Baku-Tbilisi railway and 82 km of the Silk Road pass through the region. Over 35 state and private institutions operate in Hajigabul. The largest of these institutions is the Department of the operation of Kura Water pipelines. It was opened in 1971. It provides the surrounding areas and capital of country with drinking water. The Gas Pipeline Production Department and the "Kalmaz" Underground Gas Storage meet the natural gas demand of the Republic. Railway institution operates in the district. Poultry farms named "Adishirin" and "Pirsaat" meet the egg demand of Hajigabul and nearby areas. Both farms have been operating since the independence period. Although the economy of the region is based on agriculture, recently an automobile plant put into operation in Hajigabul Industrial Estate based on the cooperation between Russian Gas Group and Azermash OJSC. Additionally, according to the order of the president of the Republic of Azerbaijan dated 2017, an industrial district will be established in Hajigabul which is considered to develop and regulated by Azerbaijan Investment Company OJSC.

Agriculture 
Agriculture plays key role in the economy of district which includes livestock, grain growing, cotton growing, horticulture and especially melon and watermelon growing.

Geography 
Hajigabul district mainly is located in the Shirvan plain and it is below sea level. The Neocene and Anthropogenic sediments cover the surface of the plain. The soil of the region is composed of grey-brown, grey-meadow, saline soils. Like other regions of Shirvan-Salyan Economic Region, it is also possible to encounter mud volcanoes in the Hajigabul district. Oil, gas, clay and oak are the main minerals of the region. The river system is very sparse due to its climate. The Kur and Pirsaat rivers, Hajigabul Lake are the major water sources are in the territory of the region. The vegetation is half-desert type. The gazelles, the red-tailed sandwiches, the turtle, the turquoise and the pigeon are the typical animals of the district.

Climate 
Hajigabul district has a dry subtropical climate with hot summers and cool winters, with some to minimal precipitation. The level of precipitation heavily depends on seasonality so that the region receives considerably more rains during the winter period rather than in the summertime. The average temperature is 2 °C in January and 26 °C in July, respectively.

Gallery

References

 
Districts of Azerbaijan